Lonnie Gordon (born November 8, 1965, Philadelphia) is an American female dance, pop and R&B singer and songwriter. She scored several chart hits during the 1990s, most notably for her 1990 UK top 10 single Happenin' All Over Again.

Early life and career
Born in Philadelphia, Pennsylvania, Gordon moved to the Bronx at an early age. In the early 1980s, she started performing around the Harlem area in clubs as the lead singer of a band called Nythjar. After meeting her husband, she relocated to England in the late 1980s, and retired from the music scene to take care of her daughter Rikki.

Gordon resumed her singing career in 1988 singing lead vocals for club-oriented acts such as Offshore, Deja Vu and most notably, House ensemble Quartzlock, releasing the singles "No Regrets", "Love Eviction" and "You Make Loving Fun". In 1989, she contributed lead vocals to Simon Harris' cover of the On the House song "(I've Got Your) Pleasure Control", which became her first charting single in the UK. The record brought her to the attention of Supreme Records, who offered her a deal in 1989.

The first single on the Supreme label, a cover of First Choice's "Let No Man Put Asunder" (re-titled "It's Not Over (Let No Man Put Asunder)"), was a club hit but did not translate into pop success. For her next single, "Happenin' All Over Again", Gordon collaborated with British hitmaking team Stock Aitken & Waterman. She had a long association with the record label Supreme dating back to 1985 with the Supreme act Princess. The single was released in January 1990. It peaked at No. 4 on the UK Singles Chart, and became a huge hit around Europe.

The planned follow-up single, the uptempo "How Could He Do This to Me", was scrapped (and was never released until years later), and the ballad "Beyond Your Wildest Dreams" was released instead in August 1990. The single peaked at No. 48. In November 1990, Gordon released her debut album's title track "If I Have to Stand Alone", which had a similar sound to "Happenin' All Over Again". The single charted at No. 68 in the UK. Her debut album, If I Have to Stand Alone, only received a limited release in Europe, Australia (where it peaked at No. 173 on the ARIA Albums Chart) and Japan.

In 1991, Gordon flew to Italy and recorded the song "Gonna Catch You", written and produced by the Italo house group Black Box. It was released as a single in the UK where it became a top 40 hit, peaking at No. 32. Due to its inclusion in the Vanilla Ice film Cool As Ice, the song became her debut release in the U.S., where it peaked at No. 1 on the U.S. Dance charts and at No. 79 on the Billboard Hot 100. This was Gordon's last release with Supreme Records.

Signed to SBK Records, Gordon released her second album Bad Mood in 1993. The album included two further U.S. No. 1 Dance singles, "Bad Mood", and a remixed version of  "Happenin' All Over Again", which also peaked at No. 98 in the Billboard Hot 100. A follow up single, "Do You Want It", also did well on the dance charts in 1994.

Gordon has hit the U.S. dance chart two more times in 1996, with the songs "Dirty Love" on Geffen Records, which peaked at No. 6, and "If You Really Love Me" released on Big Bang Records, which peaked at No. 42.  In 2000, she released the compilation album No Regret, which included many of her singles and album highlights, as well as two new songs. A cover of "He Lives in You", was released as its lead single.  Also, in 1997, Lonnie Gordon worked with European dance producers P.O.F., Roland Michael and Demetrius Ross and remixed the single, If You Really Love Me originally written and recorded by Stevie Wonder.

In 2002, Gordon starred as the lead vocalist and narrator for "Zumanity", another side of Cirque du Soleil, in Las Vegas. Working with Cirque du Soleil and moving to Las Vegas was a bold career move that provided an opportunity for Gordon to showcase her strong vocals and stage presence. After leaving Cirque du Soleil, Gordon made her way back to London, England and constantly toured, working with UK-based company Allaboutdivas.com.

In 2007, Gordon established her own label Gordon Records, from which she released four compilation albums including several new songs. She also exhibited her paintings around this time in Las Vegas.

A remastered special edition CD of her unreleased UK 1990 album, If I Have to Stand Alone, was released in April 2009 on the Cherry Pop record label, with additional unreleased mixes from PWL's vaults.

In 2009, "Catch You Baby", a re-recording of the 1991 hit, "Gonna Catch You", was released by Positiva/EMI as a digital-only download in early August 2009, with a host of mixes, including mixes by Pete Hammond and 7TH Heaven.

In 2010–2011, Gordon again toured the UK and Europe as well as performing at major HIV / AIDS benefits worldwide.

Discography

Albums
 If I Have to Stand Alone (1990–1991) Supreme Records – AUS No. 173
 Bad Mood (1993) SBK/EMI Records
 No Regret (2000) Centaur Entertainment
 Very Best of Lonnie Gordon (2002) Night & Day Records
 Looking Through Time (2007) Gordon Records
 Anthems, Vol. I (2007) Gordon Records
 Anthology Vol. 1 (2007) Gordon Records
 Anthology Vol. 2 (2007) Gordon Records
 If I Have to Stand Alone – Special Edition (2009) Cherry Pop/Cherry Red Records

Singles

As featured artist

See also
List of number-one dance hits (United States)
List of artists who reached number one on the US Dance chart

References

External links
– Lonnie Gordon's official website
– Official YouTube page

1965 births
Living people
American women singers
Musicians from Philadelphia
People from the Bronx
American expatriates in England
American women songwriters
SBK Records artists
Songwriters from Pennsylvania
Songwriters from New York (state)
American women in electronic music
21st-century American women